The Cavalry Stetson is a cavalry traditional headgear within the United States Army, typical worn by cavalrymen in the late 1860s, named after its creator John B. Stetson.

In the modern U.S. Army, the Stetson was revived as an unofficial headgear for the sake of esprit de corps in the cavalry. Because they are not authorized by AR 670-1, the regulation for wear and appearance of the uniform, wear and use of the Stetson and associated spurs is regulated by a unit commander. What follows is one example of a cavalry squadron's policy on the wear of Stetsons:

Colored cords worn on the Stetson have evolved and expanded since their introduction in 1851. Below is a list of known cord colors and what they signified from 1851 through 1943:

On April Fools' Day, 2011, the U.S. Army released a humorous statement that the official black beret of the Army would be replaced by stetsons. Below is an excerpt from the full announcement:

The statement was supplemented by pictures of soldiers with Cavalry Hats photoshopped over their berets, including a military working dog toting a stetson.

See also
 Fiddler's Green
 Cavalry
 Stetson
 Combat Cavalry Badge

References

United States military uniforms
Hats
Military hats